Pop2K (formerly XM Hitlist) is a commercial-free all-2000s radio station that is broadcast on Sirius XM Radio. It is located on channel 10 (previously 30), and Dish Network 6010 and 099-10. It plays a range of top 40 hits from 2000 to 2009.  Originally, some music would come from the late 1990s (before March 2009, the channel would play music from 1996, 1997 and 1998, but 1999 titles continue on the playlist).  The channel is also used for XM's annual pop music chronology, IT.  Starting in late 2009, the station started to play more deeper cuts and not the popular hits from the decade, to give it a more or less nostalgic flavor that the decades stations have. By 2010, no new 2010s music has been played unless it is left over from 2009 (for example, "Tik Tok" by Kesha was a number-one song in 2010 but was released in 2009), making it a 2000s-only station. By December 18, 2009, Mediabase ceased reporting the channel's playlist.

The station gets its name from Y2K, the nickname for the year 2000.

History
XM Hitlist was originally created as a commercial-free alternative to Clear Channel's CHR hits station on XM, KISS, which began airing  commercials in May 2006. When Clear Channel began airing commercials on KISS, DirecTV and AOL Radio dropped the KISS stream from their services, and added the XM Hitlist stream instead. XM Radio Canada dropped KISS entirely with no replacement.  On April 1, 2007, XM Canada added Hitlist to its channel line-up.

In 2008, the channel was rebranded as Pop2K as part of Sirius XM's channel merger. In 2009, Pop2K was dropped from Sirius Satellite Radio for four years as the channel reverted to an XM-exclusive channel, leaving Sirius with only one contemporary hit radio channel.  The Pop2K channel was replaced on the Sirius platform by BackSpin (which, ironically, is also part of XM's lineup).

On May 9, 2013, Pop2K was added back to the Sirius Satellite Radio lineup.

On August 21, 2015, Pop2K was added to Dish Network 6010, to go with Sirius XM Radio 10 after seven years.

DirecTV Channel Lineup
During its suspension on Sirius, it was also the only XM-exclusive channel owned by Sirius XM Radio featured on DirecTV channel 817. On March 27, 2009, Pop2K was added to the Sirius line-up as an internet-only channel.

On February 9, 2010, all of the Sirius XM programming on DirecTV was dropped in favor of Sonic Tap by DMX.

Former DJs
For a period of about six months between April and November 2006, Priestly and Michelle Cartier were moved from Top 20 on 20 to XM Hitlist, retaining their time slots. In November, they were moved back to Top 20 on 20 as part of the channel's relaunch. Priestly and Cartier were subsequently replaced by other DJs on XM Hitlist.

Internet Player
The internet player can be based to play either pop or rock, despite the name implying an all-pop format.

Core artists
P!nk
Kelly Clarkson
Eminem
Britney Spears
Linkin Park
Nelly
Usher
Christina Aguilera
Maroon 5
Fall Out Boy
Rihanna
Justin Timberlake
Nickelback
Will Smith
Jennifer Lopez
Beyonce
Jay-Z
Chris Brown
T.I.
Ja Rule
Ludacris
Mary J. Blige
The Pussycat Dolls
Destiny's Child
Shakira
Ashanti
Alicia Keys
50 Cent

References 

XM Satellite Radio channels
Sirius XM Radio channels
Contemporary hit radio stations in the United States
2000s-themed radio stations
Radio stations established in 2006